is a Japanese politician. She is the daughter of former Prime Minister Kakuei Tanaka and his official wife Hana.

Early life
Tanaka attended high school at Germantown Friends School in the United States and graduated from Waseda University. She spent most of her early adulthood working with her father's political machine Etsuzankai, and was first lady to her father since her mother, Hana, was absent due to long-standing illness. She was elected to the Lower House in 1993, shortly after her father's death.

Career
Tanaka was the first female foreign minister of Japan, from April 2001 to January 2002, but was fired from the cabinet after making remarks critical of Prime Minister Junichiro Koizumi.  Later that year, she was expelled from the ruling Liberal Democratic Party (LDP) and barred from party membership for two years.

In August 2002, Tanaka resigned from the Diet after allegations that she had embezzled her secretaries' civil service salaries. A Tokyo court cleared her in September, and she ran for the Diet again as an independent in November 2003.

Her husband Naoki Suzuki, whom she married in 1969 was adopted as an adult into her family, because she has no brothers to carry on the family name.

In August 2009, Tanaka and her husband joined the opposition Democratic Party of Japan.  In September 2009 she became the Diet chairperson of the Committee on Education, Culture, Sports, Science and Technology. In September 2011 she became the Diet chairperson of the Committee on Foreign Affairs.  On October 1, 2012, she became Minister of Education, Culture, Science, Sports, and Technology, as part of a reshuffle of the Yoshihiko Noda Cabinet.

On November 2, 2012 she denied applications for three new universities, contradicting a report the previous day that had endorsed the establishment of the universities. It had been 30 years since a minister had contradicted the ministry in such a way. This sparked a large amount of criticism and after pressure from within the DPJ she reversed her decision and approved the applications.

She lost her seat in the December 16, 2012 general election. She left office on 26 December 2012.

Publications 
 (with English abstract) Tanaka, Makiko. "The English Language Development Program of the Los Angeles Unified School District : Implications for Elementary School English Education in Japan." (カリフォルニア州ロサンゼルス統一学区における英語教育の試みと日本における小学校英語教育への示唆, Archive) The Journal of Kanda University of International Studies (神田外語大学紀要). Kanda University of International Studies. 2009, Volume 21.
Info page (Archive) at CiNii

References

External links

1944 births
Living people
People from Niigata Prefecture
Waseda University alumni
Children of prime ministers of Japan
Spouses of Japanese politicians
Female members of the House of Representatives (Japan)
Women government ministers of Japan
Female foreign ministers
Members of the House of Representatives (Japan)
Foreign ministers of Japan
Liberal Democratic Party (Japan) politicians
Democratic Party of Japan politicians
Official social partners of national leaders
21st-century Japanese politicians
21st-century Japanese women politicians
Japanese women diplomats
Japanese diplomats
Germantown Friends School alumni
Education ministers of Japan
Culture ministers of Japan
Science ministers of Japan
Sports ministers of Japan
Technology ministers of Japan